Enteromius sylvaticus is a species of ray-finned fish in the genus Enteromius which is found in Benin and in the lower Niger Delta in Nigeria.

Footnotes 

 

Enteromius
Taxa named by Paul V. Loiselle
Taxa named by Robin L. Welcomme
Fish described in 1971